The electoral district of Rockhampton South was a Legislative Assembly electorate in the state of Queensland, Australia.

History
Rockhampton South was created in the 1959 redistribution, taking effect at the 1960 state election, and existed until the 1972 state election.

When Rockhampton South was abolished in 1972, its area was incorporated into the district of Rockhampton.

Members

The following people were elected in the seat of Rockhampton South:

Election results

References

Former electoral districts of Queensland
1960 establishments in Australia
1972 disestablishments in Australia
Constituencies established in 1960
Constituencies disestablished in 1972